Gerda Sierens (born 28 July 1961) is a former Belgian racing cyclist. She won the Belgian national road race title in 1981.

References

External links

1961 births
Living people
Belgian female cyclists
People from Eeklo
Cyclists from East Flanders